Long Lake is a town in Florence County, Wisconsin, United States. The population was 197 at the 2000 census. The census-designated place of Long Lake is located in the town.

Geography
According to the United States Census Bureau, the town has a total area of 35.8 square miles (92.8 km2), of which, 34.0 square miles (88.0 km2) of it is land and 1.9 square miles (4.8 km2) of it (5.16%) is water.

Demographics
As of the census of 2000, there were 197 people, 91 households, and 62 families residing in the town. The population density was 5.8 people per square mile (2.2/km2). There were 296 housing units at an average density of 8.7 per square mile (3.4/km2). The racial makeup of the town was 96.45% White, 0.51% Native American, 0.51% Asian, and 2.54% from two or more races.

There were 91 households, out of which 16.5% had children under the age of 18 living with them, 65.9% were married couples living together, 1.1% had a female householder with no husband present, and 30.8% were non-families. 27.5% of all households were made up of individuals, and 14.3% had someone living alone who was 65 years of age or older. The average household size was 2.16 and the average family size was 2.59.

The population age distribution was: 15.2% under the age of 18, 6.6% from 18 to 24, 19.3% from 25 to 44, 35.0% from 45 to 64, and 23.9% who were 65 years of age or older. The median age was 51 years. For every 100 females, there were 121.3 males. For every 100 females age 18 and over, there were 111.4 males.

The median income for a household in the town was $27,500, and the median income for a family was $28,958. Males had a median income of $22,083 versus $17,250 for females. The per capita income for the town was $15,818. About 10.9% of families and 18.5% of the population were below the poverty line, including 34.5% of those under the age of eighteen and none of those 65 or over.

Long Lake has one Catholic Church, St. Norbert Parish, located at 3402 State Highway 139.  St. Norbert Parish is a mission church served from St. Leonard Parish in Laona, WI.  St. Norbert Parish first served as a mission church from Laona in 1927, became a mission church of the Florence, WI parish for a time starting in 1954, then returned to the Laona parish.

References

Towns in Florence County, Wisconsin
Iron Mountain micropolitan area
Towns in Wisconsin